Pian d'Alma is a village in Tuscany, central Italy, administratively a frazione of the comuni of Castiglione della Pescaia and Scarlino, province of Grosseto. At the time of the 2001 census its population amounted to 24.

Pian d'Alma is about 38 km from Grosseto, 17 km from Castiglione della Pescaia and 14 km from Scarlino, and it is situated in a plain, called padule Pian d'Alma, at the bottom of the hill of Poggio Ballone, near to the Tyrrhenian Sea. The plain is crossed by the Alma river.

Main sights 
 Madonna del Rosario, main parish church of the village, it was designed by engineer Ernesto Ganelli in 1958.
 Tower of Alma (10th century), ancient watchtower situated along the village's main street, it is now transformed into a private house.
 Tower of Civette (14th century), old coastal tower, it is located by the sea near to the mouth of Alma river.
 Castle of Maus (11th century), ruins of a fortress situated on the wooded hills which surround the village.

References

Bibliography 
 Aldo Mazzolai, Guida della Maremma. Percorsi tra arte e natura, Le Lettere, Florence, 1997

See also 
 Buriano, Castiglione della Pescaia
 Pian di Rocca
 Punta Ala
 Roccamare
 Rocchette
 Tirli
 Vetulonia

Frazioni of Castiglione della Pescaia
Frazioni of Scarlino